The 2022 Kwibuka Women's T20 Tournament was a women's T20I (WT20I) cricket tournament that was held in Rwanda from 9 to 18 June 2022. This was the eighth edition of the annual Kwibuka T20 Tournament, first played in 2014 in remembrance of the victims of the 1994 genocide against the Tutsi. Matches were played at two venues in the city of Kigali – the Gahanga International Cricket Stadium and the IPRC Cricket Ground. Kenya were the defending champions, having won the 2021 edition. This was the fourth time that Kenya had won the tournament.

Eleven teams were originally announced to participate this year, compared to five in 2021, highlighting the continued growth in size and reputation of the Kwibuka tournament. Teams originally confirmed to take part were hosts Rwanda, defending champions Kenya, previous winners Tanzania and Uganda, as well as Botswana, Nigeria and, making their first appearances at the Kwibuka tournament, Brazil, Germany, Ghana, Sierra Leone and Zimbabwe. However, the tournament was later reduced to eight teams. This was the first edition of the Kwibuka tournament to feature teams from outside of Africa.

After the first three days of action, Kenya and Nigeria were unbeaten with three wins each. On day four, Tanzania maintained their 100% record by defeating the Kenyans, and moved top of the table after Nigeria were bowled out for only 43 runs by Uganda. After the round-robin stage was completed, Kenya and the undefeated Tanzania qualified for the final, while the hosts progressed to the third-place play-off against Uganda.

On the first day of the play-offs, Germany beat Botswana to finish in seventh place, and Nigeria beat Brazil to finish fifth overall. On the final day of the competition, Uganda beat Rwanda to finish in third place, and Tanzania defeated Kenya in the final to win the tournament for a second time. Tanzania had won the tournament in their only previous appearance in 2019, but had been unable to defend the title in 2021 due to the COVID-19 pandemic.

Squads

Round-robin

Points table

 Advanced to the final
 Advanced to the third-place play-off
 Advanced to the fifth-place play-off
 Advanced to the seventh-place play-off

Fixtures

Day one

Day two

Day three

Day four

Day five

Day six

Day seven

Day eight

Play-offs

7th-place play-off

5th-place play-off

3rd-place play-off

Final

References

External links
 Series home at ESPN Cricinfo

Cricket in Rwanda
2022 Kwibuka Women's T20 Tournament
Rwanda in international cricket
2022 in women's cricket
Associate international cricket competitions in 2022
Kwibuka Women's T20 Tournament